Flight record may refer to:
 Flight endurance record
 Flight distance record
 Flight altitude record
 Flight airspeed record
 Longest flights